The Great Crossings Bridge is a masonry bridge which is on the National Road between Somerset County and Fayette County, Pennsylvania. It crosses the Youghiogheny River near Confluence, Pennsylvania.

History and architectural features

The town of Somerfield, Pennsylvania, which was originally named Smythfield, was built at the eastern end of the bridge in 1817. The bridge and town were later inundated by Youghiogheny River Lake, a reservoir that began filling in 1940.

The bridge remains standing in the reservoir, and may be crossed at times when water levels are low, just downstream from the present U.S. Route 40 bridge.

References

Stone arch bridges in the United States
National Road
Bridges in Somerset County, Pennsylvania
Youghiogheny River
Submerged buildings and structures
Bridges in Fayette County, Pennsylvania